Tukvar Tea Garden is a village in the Darjeeling Pulbazar CD block in the Darjeeling Sadar subdivision of the Darjeeling district in the state of West Bengal, India.

Geography

Location                                                

Area overview
The map alongside shows the northern portion of the Darjeeling Himalayan hill region. In Darjeeling Sadar subdivision 61% of the total population lives in the rural areas and 39% of the population lives in the urban areas. There are 78 tea gardens/ estates (the figure varies slightly according to different sources), producing and largely exporting Darjeeling tea in the district. It engages a large proportion of the population directly/ indirectly. Some tea gardens were identified in the 2011 census as census towns or villages. Such places are marked in the map as CT (census town) or R (rural/ urban centre). Specific tea estate pages are marked TE.

Note: The map alongside presents some of the notable locations in the subdivision. All places marked in the map are linked in the larger full screen map.

Demographics
According to the 2011 Census of India, Tukvar Tea Garden had a total population of 4,791 of which 2,339 (49%) were males and 2,452 (51%) were females. There were 397 persons in the age range of 0 to 6 years. The total number of literate people in Tukvar Tea Garden was 3,529 (73.66% of the population over 6 years).

Tea estates
The management of Tukvar Tea Estate had issued an order for “suspension of work” after some workers had allegedly tried to beat up a manager. As of 2016, it remained closed.

North Tukvar Tea Estate is one of the oldest tea gardens in Darjeeling. It started commercial production in 1856.

Puttabong Tea Estate was formerly known as Tukvar Tea Estate.

Vah Tukvar, an old and historical tea garden, fell on bad days and effectively closed down around 1995, although no formal announcement about its closure was made. The Chamong group acquired the abandoned Vah Tukvar, renamed it Shree Dwarika, and reopened its gates in 2006.

Darjeeling Ropeway
Darjeeling Ropeway was started in 1968 from Singamari in Darjeeling. In 45 minutes, the ropeway transported passengers from a height of 7,000 ft down to 800 feet where the last station was located at Singla Bazar on the bank of the Rangeet. As of 2020, the ropeway runs only up to Tukvar.

References

Villages in Darjeeling district